Karin Bauer (born 16 December 1963) is an Austrian sports shooter. She competed in two events at the 1984 Summer Olympics.

References

1963 births
Living people
Austrian female sport shooters
Olympic shooters of Austria
Shooters at the 1984 Summer Olympics
Place of birth missing (living people)